Andreas Hinze (born 26 October 1959) is a former German footballer.

Hinze made 13 appearances for Tennis Borussia Berlin in the 2. Fußball-Bundesliga during his playing career.

References

External links 
 

1959 births
Living people
German footballers
Association football midfielders
2. Bundesliga players
Tennis Borussia Berlin players